Kate Whitley (born 1989) is an English composer and pianist.

Career
She is classically trained and studied music at King's College, Cambridge. Her music is recorded by NMC Recordings and her debut release, I am, I say was released in 2017. It was described as "unpretentious and appealingly vigorous music" and "an excellent introduction to her sonic world". She won a Borletti-Buitoni Trust Special Award in 2014. Her music has been broadcast live on BBC Radio 3 and performed as part of the BBC Proms.

In 2017, Whitley was commissioned by Radio 3 to compose a piece for International Women's Day, setting the words of Malala Yousafzai's 2013 speech to the UN. The piece, called Speak Out, was premiered on 8 March 2017 in the Hoddinott Hall in Cardiff, with the BBC National Orchestra of Wales and Chorus of Wales alongside the children's choir Cor y Cwm, conducted by Xian Zhang.

Her concert piece Sky Dances, was commissioned by the London Symphony Orchestra and performed in the summer of 2018 at Trafalgar Square. Sir Simon Rattle conducted the LSO and 70 young musicians from East London. The ballet Ignite, written for Birmingham Royal Ballet, toured the same year. In July 2022 a new oratorio, Our Future In Your Hands was performed at the Buxton Festival, with an orchestra of young musicians from the Royal Northern College of Music and a choir drawn from local schools. The text, by Laura Attridge, voices climate change concerns from the point of view of young people.

Multi-Story Orchestra 
Whitley co-founded the Multi-Story Orchestra with conductor Christopher Stark in 2011. The orchestra's first performance was of Stravinsky's The Rite of Spring in a car park in Peckham, London. The project won the 2016  Royal Philharmonic Society Music Award for Audiences and Engagement. The orchestra also works with school children and local community groups.

List of works

Solo/chamber works 

 Duo for violin and viola
 3 pieces for violin and piano
 Five piano pieces
 Two songs for clarinet and piano
 Lines for string quartet

Orchestral 

 Autumn Songs for 12 solo strings (7 violins, 2 violas, 2 cellos, bass)
 Viola Concerto
 Split for solo clarinet, solo percussion and strings
 The Animals 
 Sky Dances

Choral 

 I am I say (words by Sabrina Mahfouz) for soprano, bass, children's choir orchestra
 Speak Out (words by Malala Yousafzai, written in support of the campaign for girls’ right to education) for children's choir, SATB chorus and orchestra
 Alive (words by Holly McNish) for children's choir and orchestra
 The Cruel Cut (words by Sabrina Mahfouz, written in support of the campaign to stop FGM in the UK) for 4 sopranos, community choir including solo untrained voice, piano
 * Our Future In Your Hands, oratorio, words by Laura Attridge, Buxton Festival, fp 10 July 2022

Dramatic 

 Paws and Padlocks (children's opera, libretto by Sabrina Mahfouz)
 Unknown Position (libretto by Emma Hogan)
 Ignite, ballet (2018)

References 

1989 births
Living people
English women pianists
Alumni of King's College, Cambridge
English composers
British women classical composers
21st-century English women musicians
21st-century pianists
21st-century British composers
21st-century women composers
21st-century women pianists